David Rowe  (David Alexander Rowe), is an Australian cartoonist.

He grew up in Canberra. Rowe's father worked in the Department of Foreign Affairs and his mother worked in the Prime Minister’s Department. Rowe attended the Australian National University and initially studied economics, later studying art history and then political science, then studied graphic design at Reid TAFE, finally moving to Canberra Art School.

He has made cartoons on political issues for the Australian Financial Review. He had earlier worked for the Canberra Times as a cartoonist in the 1980s.

He regularly appears in the annual series Best Australian Political Cartoons edited by Russ Radcliffe.  He is also well documented in the National Museum political cartoon inventory.

In 2013 he was the Behind the Lines, Cartoonist of the year. Also in 2017.

He also exhibited cartoons in Sydney in 2013.

In 2015 he published a volume titled Mindless colouring 101.

Publications in which illustrations are attributed

References

Australian editorial cartoonists
Living people
People from Canberra
Year of birth missing (living people)